CASA (formerly CASA of Maryland) is a Latino and immigration advocacy-and-assistance organization based in Maryland. It is active throughout the state, but has major foci in Prince George's County, Montgomery County and Baltimore. CASA influences Maryland politics on a wide range of policies, ranging from law-enforcement to education. It also has offices in Virginia, Pennsylvania, and Georgia.

History
CASA was originally known as the "Central American Solidarity Association of Maryland". The organization's name was officially changed to CASA of Maryland, Inc., on July 28, 1995. The organization's name was officially changed to CASA de Maryland, Inc., on September 4, 2008. Now, the organization is named CASA.

CASA was founded in 1985 in the basement of the Takoma Park Presbyterian Church by US citizens and Central American immigrants.  It has since expanded its scope.
It is affiliate organization of the National Council of La Raza.
They are a member of the National Day Laborer Organizing Network.
CASA is also a founding member of the National Capital Immigration Coalition, which promotes "comprehensive immigration reform".

In June 2010, CASA opened a  multicultural center in the heart of Langley Park and located in the former Langley Park mansion.
The project was budgeted at $31 million in 2007. Governor Martin O'Malley, a Democrat, said at the fundraising kickoff for the project, "In our Maryland, there's no such thing as a spare American".

Activity
CASA offers health assistance, medical interpretations, English classes, financial literacy classes, vocational training, social services, leadership development, legal services, and employment placement for low-income families, particularly Latino immigrants and other immigrants.  CASA provides legal support to the large and growing community of immigrants—documented or otherwise—in the greater Washington, D.C. metropolitan area. They have successfully promoted a wide range of legislation in support of the immigrant community, including a Maryland law that requires reasonable access to government services for people with limited English proficiency.
CASA is very aggressive in pursuing absconding employers, contractors who do not pay their day-laborers.

CASA is also involved in housing law and advocacy. In 2004, CASA attorney Kimberley A. Propeack told the Daily Record that the group's housing attorney represents immigrants who are targeted by landlords if they raise concerns or try to form residents' associations.
CASA has rescued a number of victims of domestic slavery, also known as human trafficking.

Day labor centers
CASA operates five day labor centers throughout the state of Maryland, with public and private funding; three centers are in Montgomery County.  These centers, run by CASA on behalf of the county government under contract, provide central sites where contractors can pick up day-laborers. The centers have sparked protests and counter-protests.
The center near Shady Grove was damaged by a fire within its first month of operation; the fire was ruled to be arson and classified a "hate incident" by county police.
The centers allow day laborers to seek work without violating Gaithersburg's anti-solicitation ordinance, a law that makes it a misdemeanor to conduct hires in public places.
Most of the opposition centers around the assumption that many of the day-laborers in Montgomery County are undocumented workers, mostly from Central America.

CASA opened an employment center in Baltimore on December 20, 2007. The center is funded by foundations and Community Development Block Grant funds; renovation of the building housing the center was funded by the City of Baltimore and an anonymous donor. According to Maryland Secretary of the Department of Labor, Licensing and Regulation, Thomas Perez, "Labor centers are the most cost-effective investment of government money I can imagine ... We're providing employment, addressing public safety by creating an orderly process, keeping people from street corners and protecting workers."  The opening was applauded by local labor groups, immigrant advocates, and city leaders.  Local residents had been pushing for an alternative to street-corner hiring.

Funding
CASA has received funding from a variety of sources, including a two-year grant funding operations in Baltimore from George Soros' Open Society Institute.
Other funding sources include the Annie E. Casey Foundation and United Way.
CASA received $1.5 million from CITGO, the state-owned Venezuelan petroleum products corporation, in 2008 to fund educational, training, and economic-development programs.

Criticism
CASA works on many issues of concern to the immigrant community in Maryland, and as a result, CASA has been a source of controversy. Most of the controversy centers around allegations that the day-labor centers administrated by the group are primarily used by undocumented immigrants, who may not legally be employed in any capacity in the US.

Montgomery County day-labor center
Montgomery County's award of contracts to develop day-labor centers near Gaithersburg to CASA ignited some controversy, including a case of arson.

The site, located outside both Gaithersburg and Rockville, was a service park behind a Department of Liquor Control warehouse, and was opened as a temporary location.  Because of the site's location, the county had sole control over the site approval process; although the county Planning Board had to undertake a mandatory referral process, the planning rules allowed County Executive Isiah Leggett to make the ultimate decision.

The site stirred worry in nearby Derwood and other communities. Some residents expressed concerns about the proposal.

In a letter to The Gazette, Brad Botwin announced that he was forming a group called Help Save Maryland because of "growing abuses of official power", specifically the day-labor center near Shady Grove.  Botwin characterized the center as "a taxpayer-funded illegal worker pickup center on property slated for job-creating high-tech companies and a needed fire station."
Botwin, a member of the Shady Grove Advisory Committee and former co-president of the Greater Shady Grove Civic Alliance, was concerned over the center's impact on the sector plan implementation process.  He said that the plan required extensive committee meetings and approvals, but Leggett did not use such processes in siting the center.

Pat Labuda, president of the Greater Shady Grove Civic Alliance and also a member of the Shady Grove Advisory Committee, said "I think it's a problem that what Rockville and Gaithersburg don't want, Derwood gets".  Like Botwin, Labuda was concerned about the center's impact on the sector plan.  While Labuda supported the need for the facility, she expressed the wish that the county had discussed it with residents before choosing the site.

A Gaithersburg resident task force that had studied the day-laborer situation supported the proposal.  Cathy Drzyzgula, a member of that task force, called the proposal "a middle path, since it pleases neither extreme, but instead the larger share of people who hold moderate views on the issue" in a letter to The Gazette.

Rights pamphlet
In response to local immigration raids, CASA published a pamphlet with basic information about rights such as the right to remain silent and the right to an attorney.  According to The Washington Times, the pamphlet, "which features cartoonlike drawings of armed black and white police officers escorting Hispanic men in handcuffs and shows babies crying because their fathers are behind bars, is the product of CASA of Maryland Inc., working with other organizations."

CASA director of community organizing and political action Kim Propeack said "We consider providing people with accurate information about their rights fundamentally important to the people we serve, the local community concerned about public safety, and to the national community, which has adopted a bill of rights".

Representative Dana Rohrabacher of California, a Republican, called the pamphlet "harmful to America" because it teaches illegal aliens "how to circumvent the law", and that CASA was "aiding and abetting criminal activity" by distributing it.

Minuteman Project
Statements to The Gazette by Gustavo Torres, CASA's Executive Director, that CASA was determined to track the leadership of a local unit of Minuteman Project, caused controversy.  The Maryland Minuteman Civil Defense Corps, a non-governmental watchdog group, photographed and videotaped employers hiring workers at day-laborer sites run by CASA, with the intent of reporting the employers to state and Federal officials as violating immigration laws.  Torres told The Gazette that CASA would target the Minutemen: "We are going picket their houses, and the schools of their kids, and go to their work. If they are going to do this to us, we are going to respond in the same way, to let people know their neighbors are extremists, that they are anti-immigrant."
Torres later partially retracted this statement, saying that his threat to picket schools attended by Minuteman members' children was a "misunderstanding" made in anger.

Steven Schreiman, president of the Maryland Minuteman Civil Defense Corps, said  "the threat shows an intent and it shows their mentality, and it shows them for what they are[...] They’re a bunch of thugs and bullies and they have a political agenda and they want to push that agenda regardless of the costs or consequences. Furthermore, they’ve threatened to go after us at our homes and our places of business, which is harassment."

Kim Propeack, CASA spokeswoman, said "People should not expect in a modern society to engage in a campaign of intimidation without having a response", adding that if the Minutemen "want to come to CASA de Maryland, it's perfectly legitimate of us to go to the Minutemen's homes and also protest."

Enforcement of immigration laws
CASA promotes community policing over local police enforcement of immigration enforcement, a power historically reserved to the federal government.  Montgomery County officials expressed support for this notion, yet the government's inclusion, in 2002, of hundreds of thousands of names of people who had outstanding deportation orders into the National Crime Information Center (NCIC) database threatened to undermine Montgomery County's efforts.  Ignoring a deportation order is an administrative violation, not a violation of criminal law; the NCIC is, by design, a database of criminal warrants.
Two police associations lobbied against the inclusion, saying that it would hinder cooperation from witnesses and victims of violent crimes who are in the country unlawfully.

CASA advocated that the Montgomery County Department of Police ignore these civil detainers. "These are people who haven’t broken any laws other than getting a traffic ticket, and they’re being arrested and taken to jail", declared Kim Propeack, CASA director of community action.
At a meeting with Latino advocates in late June 2007, County Police Chief J. Thomas Manger said that while he disagrees with the decision to put immigration detainers in NCIC, he believes police officers have no choice but to serve them.  As a result, The Gazette reported, "the chief said he could not in 'good conscience' order his officers not to serve the warrants if he were told to ignore them by county officials. 'Get a new police chief when that happens,'" said Manger, who later clarified that he had no intent to leave.  Manger, who was praised by Propeack for his accessibility, said that the immigration issue "breaks my heart."
, Montgomery County police were still checking, and honoring, the NCIC wants-and-warrants notifications, albeit with some reluctance as evidenced in this statement from Chief Manger: "It's very important for the local police department to develop strong relationships with the community[...] That trust is being jeopardized 

CASA's executive director Gustavo Torres said, "We dearly hope that the county re-evaluates its role serving as immigration police[...] The [county police's] enforcement of civil immigration law has severely damaged the faith of the immigration community in its county."  , Maryland did not have a consistent statewide policy on civil detainers.  The Frederick County sheriff's office has deputies with specialized training in searching for undocumented immigrants, while the Prince George's County Police do not enforce immigration warrants as a matter of county policy.  Takoma Park has a policy of being a "sanctuary city" and does not permit its police department to arrest people based on criminal immigration warrants.

Lawsuits
CASA has launched a variety of lawsuits. One such lawsuit was against the Maryland Motor Vehicle Administration to improve the administration of drivers licenses for out of country applicants.
The lawsuit is ongoing, but is essentially mooted by implementation of the Federal Real ID Act of 2005.  In response to Real ID, the Motor Vehicle Administration considered a two-tiered system, issuing Maryland drivers licenses and then another Real ID–compliant identification that would permit entry into Federal buildings and the boarding of airplanes. Maryland, along with several other states, was given an extension of time to comply with Real ID requirements. Governor Martin O'Malley rejected the proposal, directing the Maryland Motor Vehicle Administration to phase in compliance with Real ID . CASA's Kim Propeack said "The administration is prioritizing political pandering over good policymaking" and that the governor "is ignoring all the support he's heard over the years for the system as it exists".

In November 2008, CASA filed a Public Information Act lawsuit alleging that the Frederick County Sheriff's Office violated the Constitution and engaged in racial profiling by performing immigration law enforcement functions under section 287(g) of the Immigration and Nationality Act. "We're trying to shine a light on this program, which we feel has been kind of operating in the shadows," said Justin Cox, an attorney for CASA. "We have very strong anecdotal evidence of constitutional violations and racial profiling and the ultimate goal is to make sure the Sheriff's Office is being held accountable."

See also
League of United Latin American Citizens

References

External links

American community activists
Hispanic and Latino American culture in Maryland
Immigrant rights organizations in the United States
Langley Park, Maryland
Non-profit organizations based in Maryland
Companies based in Takoma Park, Maryland
1985 establishments in Maryland
Workers' rights organizations based in the United States
Hispanic and Latino American culture in Virginia
Hispanic and Latino American culture in Pennsylvania